Hadrien Federiconi (born 5 September 1987), better known by his stage name Feder, is a French DJ from Nice. Currently based in Paris, he gained fame in 2014 through "Sixto", his remix of Rodriguez' song "Can't Get Away".

He signed to Atlantic Records (Warner Music) and he gained international chart success through his own track "Goodbye" featuring vocals of Lyse (Anne-Lyse Blanc). The song "Goodbye" reached number one in sales in France and Switzerland, as well as number one on iTunes charts for France, Italy, Belgium, Switzerland, Russia, Hungary, Turkey, Czech Republic and Top 10 on iTunes in Germany, Greece, Denmark, Spain, Netherlands, Austria and South Africa. Feder won 'Best New French DJ' at the 2015 NRJ DJ Awards.

In 2018, he produced and co-composed the album of the French singer Mylène Farmer titled Désobéissance.

Discography

Singles

References

External links
 Facebook

French DJs
Living people
People from Nice
Musicians from Paris
1987 births